The Acme Aircraft Corporation was an American aircraft manufacturer based in Rockford, Illinois, founded in 1928.

The company president was R.S. Link and the general manager was P.H. Ryan.

Products
The company was established to produce biplane sport aircraft in the  range. The company built one Acme Biplane and also produced the parasol wing Acme Sportsman. The Sportsman was designed by Edward A. Stalker, the head of the Department of Aeronautical Engineering at the University of Michigan. Only two of that model were completed before the company went out of business by 1931, in the Great Depression.

Aircraft

References

Companies based in Rockford, Illinois
Defunct aircraft manufacturers of the United States